Brett Anthony Hales (born 2 April 1985) is an Australian entrepreneur, mentor and investor. He is best known as the founder and chairman of Tappr, a mobile payments company based in Brisbane, Australia. Tappr is Hales's first start-up.

Early life 

He was born in Melbourne, Australia, the son and oldest child of Plumber Greg Kenneth Hales (1950–present) and Lorraine Joy Hales (1953–present). Hales grew up in Melbourne until he was 5 when he moved to the seaside town of Point Lonsdale, Victoria. He attended Catholic Regional College in Geelong before at fifteen, Hales and his family moved to Noosa Heads, Queensland. Out of school he became a qualified Scuba Dive Master to pay the bills. During 2005, Hales went for a year-long journey to Europe and North America before returning to Australia in 2006. Back in Australia with little money he saved, Hales moved to Brisbane. Living in Brisbane, his network grew and he became friends with Ben Lawton and Matthew Wick. During this time, Hales looked towards setting up his own company and in late 2011 Hales started the ground-work for Tappr with the $18,000 he had saved. During 2011, Hales travelled on holiday to Hong Kong and while there was acclimatised to Hong Kong's Octopus Transit Card System. Hales envisioned the idea of a transit payment solution that predominately uses smart phones via NFC (near field communication) as the method of transacting while integrating into the emerging mobile payment landscape. This concept was the start of Tappr.

Career 

Hales started Tappr in his living room and started writing and developing the necessary proposals in order to attract seed investors and angel investors. Requiring some further resources and assistance in application and hardware development, he reached out to Pyxi Apps Australia's managing director Kerry Esson and the two started to form the finer plans for development with Kerry Esson eventually coming on full-time as the company's CIO (chief information officer) and director.  Over the next few months, Hales successfully attracted a host of local and international investors. Studying Australia's banking environment, Hales focused on developing Tappr's business model to cater towards using the Big 4 Banks in Australia as an aggregator as well as an acquirer. with a focus on enriching the business to consumer relationship by offering add-ons including customer analytics and marketing enriched data. Juvo, Tappr's first product is a mobile card acceptance terminal that enables users to accept card payments using their iOS or Android smart phone or tablet. Juvo means "to aid or assist" in Latin, which is a core belief of Tappr. Juvo was due to launch into the Australian market in early 2014 and
on 18 August 2013, Hales announced plans to start up his own technology investment fund supporting young entrepreneurs with both funding, resources and mentorship. The Seed Fund launched in mid-2014.

Mentoring, speaking and other interests 
Hales mentors a host of startups and had worked with startup-focused partners, including The Hub (Singapore), Muru-D (Brisbane), Little Tokyo Two (Brisbane) and Startmiup (Milan). Hales is also a regular at FinTech focused summits, conferences and events.

Interests 
Hales is a Motorcycle enthusiast, qualified scuba dive master and avid surfer.

References 

Living people
1985 births
Chief information officers